Cliff Eisen (born 21 January 1952 in Toronto) is a Canadian musicologist and a Mozart expert. He was based in the Department of Music at King's College London. He studied at the University of Toronto and at Cornell University, and has taught at the University of Western Ontario and New York University. His research focuses on the Classical period, particularly Mozart and performance practice. He has written extensively on the issues of authenticity surrounding the works of Leopold Mozart and his son, Wolfgang. Other publications of his deal with Mozart's chamber music, life in Salzburg, biography and his life in contemporary documentation as well as Cole Porter.

References

1952 births
Living people
University of Toronto alumni
Cornell University alumni
Academics of King's College London
New York University faculty
Canadian biographers
Canadian male non-fiction writers
Male biographers
Canadian musicologists
Mozart scholars
Academic staff of the University of Western Ontario